The Clearwater River is a river situated on the Olympic Peninsula in Washington. It is the main tributary of the Queets River. The Clearwater's main tributaries are the Snahapish River and the Solleks River.

See also
List of rivers of Washington

References

Rivers of Washington (state)
Rivers of Jefferson County, Washington